StreamZilla is a streaming media hosting and content delivery network (CDN) in Europe. The company is located in the Mediacentrale in the city Groningen, Netherlands.

Overview 
StreamZilla offers streaming media and media file hosting and delivery services to customers like video portals, broadcasters, football clubs, publishers, enterprises and video production companies.

Achievements 
 StreamZilla won the Streaming Media Magazine Readers' Choice award for best European Content Delivery Network 2008.
 In 2008, over 2 billion videos were distributed to viewers all over the world.

Technologies 
StreamZilla is powered by a European wide 2Tbit/s network with +500Gbit/s connections to all the major internet exchanges and global carriers. These servers are powered by the XL Media Server framework that enables simultaneous operation of all popular media services including  Flash Media Server, Windows Media Services, QuickTime Streaming Server, Wowza Media Server, Icecast, Internet Information Server and Apache without performance loss. The media servers are managed by a central Content Delivery Management application called VDO-X.

References

Networks